Uladzimir Iharavich Ignatik (born 14 July 1990 in Belarus) is a Belarusian professional tennis player.

Professional career

Junior career
Igantik was ranked the No. 1 junior in the world in June 2007 after winning the boys' singles title at 2007 Roland Garros, and later finished runner-up at the 2007 Wimbledon Championships. Then as the top seed, Ignatik lost in the quarterfinals of the 2007 US Open.

Early career
Ignatik gained ATP points mainly by playing in Futures tournaments. He finished 2007 ranked 864 in the world, and 2008 ranked 431 in the world. Ignatik played his first two rubbers for Belarus in Davis Cup in 2008, at the age of 17, against Switzerland, losing in four sets to the top 20 player Stanislas Wawrinka, as well as losing a dead rubber to Yves Allegro in two sets. Ignatik got his first two wins in his next fixture against Georgia, defeating Lado Chikhladze in three sets, and Nodar Itonishvili in a dead rubber.

2009
Ignatik continued to play Futures in 2009. In May 2009, Ignatik retired in his first rubber against South Africa, which Belarus would go on to lose 5–0. In June Ignatik won his first Futures tournament in Poland. In August Ignatik hit a rich vein of form, reaching the final in a Futures in Serbia, followed by a win two weeks later in Poland. Two weeks later he won another Futures in Turkey, and the following week he won another in Spain. After this win Ignatik was ranked within the top 300, and began to participate in Challenger level tournaments.

In November Ignatik got back-to-back quarter-finals in Jersey and Yokohama, before winning his first Challenger in Tokyo at the end of the month. He finished the year ranked No. 192 in the world.

2010
Ignatik began the year playing in the Futures circuit again, making it to the finals in one Futures tournament in Britain. After this, he went back to playing in the Challenger tour, but as of May, hadn't made it to the quarterfinals of any of these tournaments. In the Davis Cup, Ignatik lost both of his singles rubbers in a tie against Italy.

2011
Ignatik won his second Challenger in Guangzhou defeating Alexandre Kudryavtsev in the final.

2012
He won his third Challenger in Tashkent defeating Lukáš Lacko in the final.

ATP Challenger and ITF Futures finals

Singles: 33 (23–10)

Doubles: 26 (10–16)

Junior Grand Slam Finals

Singles: 2 (1 title, 1 runner-up)

Singles performance timeline

References

External links
 
 
 

1990 births
Living people
Belarusian male tennis players
French Open junior champions
Grand Slam (tennis) champions in boys' singles
Tennis players from Minsk
21st-century Belarusian people